The canton of Châteaubriant is an administrative division of the Loire-Atlantique department, western France. Its borders were modified at the French canton reorganisation which came into effect in March 2015. Its seat is in Châteaubriant.

It consists of the following communes:
 
La Chapelle-Glain
Châteaubriant
Erbray
Fercé
Grand-Auverné
Issé
Juigné-des-Moutiers
Louisfert
La Meilleraye-de-Bretagne
Moisdon-la-Rivière
Noyal-sur-Brutz
Petit-Auverné
Rougé
Ruffigné
Saint-Aubin-des-Châteaux
Saint-Julien-de-Vouvantes
Soudan
Soulvache
Villepot

References

Cantons of Loire-Atlantique